Idhaya Veenai is a 1972 Indian Tamil-language film, directed by R. Krishnan and S. Panju. The film stars M. G. Ramachandran, Lakshmi and Manjula, with Sivakumar, M. N. Nambiar and M. G. Chakrapani in supporting roles.

Plot 

Somewhere in Madras, several years previously, a young Sundaram was driven away from home by Sivaraman, his father, a severe lawyer. Sivaraman denies his son. Sundaram makes a promise to his father, that one day, he will beg him to recognize him. He currently lives in the Kashmir as a tourist guide. When he finds Nalini, his younger sister, in the middle of a group of students, Sundaram decides to go back home, to gain knowledge of her and help the situation. But at the beginning, he incurs only troubles, in particular, with Kirymani, the lover of Nalini and Annamalai, a man with a double life.

Cast 

The casting is established according to the original order of the credits of opening of the movie, except those not mentioned.

Production 
The film was produced by Udhaya Productions. Parts of Idhaya Veenai were shot in Kashmir.

Soundtrack 
The music was composed by Shankar–Ganesh. The song "Kashmir Beautiful" attained popularity. Veena player Raghavan was initially approached to play the veena, but declined due to scheduling conflicts; his son R. Parthasarathy signed on instead.

Release 
Idhaya Veenai was released on 20 October 1972, Ramachandran's first release since his expulsion from the political party Dravida Munnetra Kazhagam and started a party Anna Dravida Munnetra Kazhagam.

References

Bibliography

External links 
 

1970s Tamil-language films
1972 films
Films directed by Krishnan–Panju
Films scored by Shankar–Ganesh